

Winners

The following is the list of Award winning films for the Karnataka State Best Social film award.

See also
 Karnataka State Film Awards

References

Karnataka State Film Awards
1993 establishments in Karnataka